Carol Rose may refer to:

 Carol Rose (lawyer), executive director of the American Civil Liberties Union of Massachusetts
 Carol Rose (horse breeder) (born 1941), champion horsewoman and breeder
 Carol M. Rose, law professor